Edward Bowman may refer to:

 Eddie Bowman (born 1944), English rugby league footballer
 Edward M. Bowman, member of the Dakota Territory House of Representatives
 Edward R. Bowman (1826–1898), U.S. Navy sailor and Medal of Honor recipient
 Edward Kellett-Bowman (1931–2022), British business and management consultant, and MEP